The second season of the television series Law & Order: Special Victims Unit premiered October 20, 2000, and ended May 11, 2001, on NBC. The show remained in its time slot, Friday nights at 10pm/9c. As Neal Baer's first year producing the show, the second season was accompanied by drastic changes in tone. Additionally, the series began to increase its focus on trial scenes with the addition of an Assistant District Attorney for sex crimes to the cast.

Production
David J. Burke and Neal Baer served as chief executive producers to replace Robert Palm. Baer took over in the season finale. Neal Baer, a former pediatrician, left ER to work for Dick Wolf's first Law & Order spin-off. When explaining how he first became interested in the show, Neal Baer said he was "drawn to it by Mariska", who appeared in ER. Mariska Hargitay felt that Baer gave the show the direction it previously lacked and explained: "There was no consistency. Dick wasn't really here. We had no leader, we had no vision." Jonathan Greene also credited Baer with improving the quality of the show, saying "He literally took this, not just to the next level, but up five or six levels above that." In a video interview, Richard Belzer said "The show's better this year, so I think it's directly attributable to him being at the helm."

The second episode of the season "Honor," was based on a script that Jonathan Greene had written previously. In it, the squad is exposed to misogynistic "honor killings" used to punish women for adultery. As one reviewer puts it, "Airing one full year before the 9/11 terror attacks, this episode examines Taliban rules and plays differently today than it did when NBC first aired it."

Cast changes and returning characters
First season cast members Christopher Meloni (Detective Elliot Stabler), Mariska Hargitay (Detective Olivia Benson), Richard Belzer (Detective John Munch), and Dann Florek (Captain Don Cragen) returned to the show for the second season. Cast member Michelle Hurd (Detective Monique Jeffries) began to depart the cast over the first half of the season.

Hurd ultimately departed from the series to join the Showtime drama Leap Years. After her departure from the show, Hurd said, "I think it's just sad they didn't have faith to stick around with me." However, she said she bore no ill feelings about her time on Law & Order: Special Victims Unit, but felt the casting on Leap Years was a "rare opportunity." Gossip blogger Roger Friedman reported that Richard Belzer arranged for Hurd to be fired because her character was receiving too many storylines and distracting attention from him, but that report was never confirmed. Although Jeffries departed from the Special Victims Unit during the episode "Asunder," her character was still present in the episode "Runaway," which marked the character's final appearance. "Runaway" was originally intended to air before "Asunder" but was broadcast out of order; and thus new scenes were filmed to present the episode as a "flashback". The retcon explanation in "Runaway" is that Detective Jeffries transferred to Vice and briefly stepped into the SVU squad room again when they were in need of extra manpower for a case. Hurd was replaced by rapper-turned-actor Ice-T, who began portraying Detective Odafin "Fin" Tutuola.

Stephanie March joined the cast as Assistant District Attorney Alexandra Cabot when the series was using many guest actors and actresses to portray ADA characters in the first season. Tamara Tunie took on the recurring role of Medical Examiner Melinda Warner, replacing Leslie Hendrix's Law & Order character Chief Medical Examiner Elizabeth Rodgers. BD Wong began portraying FBI Forensic Psychiatrist Dr. George Huang closer to the end of the season, replacing Dr. Emil Skoda (J. K. Simmons).

Cast

Main cast
 Christopher Meloni as Senior Detective Elliot Stabler
 Mariska Hargitay as Junior Detective Olivia Benson
 Richard Belzer as Senior Detective John Munch
 Michelle Hurd as Junior Detective Monique Jeffries (episodes 1, 7 and 16)
 Stephanie March as Assistant District Attorney Alexandra Cabot (episodes 2–21)
 Ice-T as Junior Detective Odafin "Fin" Tutuola (episodes 2–21)
 Dann Florek as Captain Donald "Don" Cragen

Crossover stars
 J. K. Simmons as Dr. Emil Skoda (crossing over with Law & Order)
 Carolyn McCormick as Dr. Elizabeth Olivet (crossing over with Law & Order)

Recurring cast

 Doris Belack as Judge Margaret Barry
 BD Wong as Dr. George Huang
 Lou Carbonneau as Crime Scene Unit Forensics Technician Harry Martin
 Frank Deal as Defense Attorney Don Newvine
 Kent Cassella as Detective Palmieri
 Brian Keane as Dr Peters
 Joanna Merlin as Judge Lena Petrovsky
 Jeffrey DeMunn as Chief Assistant District Attorney Charlie Phillips
 Harvey Atkin as Judge Alan Ridenour
 Rob Bartlett as Defense Attorney Milton Schoenfeld
Tom O'Rourke as Judge Mark Seligman

 Isabel Gillies as Kathy Stabler
 Erin Broderick as Maureen Stabler
 Brian O'Neill as Chief Sullivan
 Dylan Price as Detective Danny Tatum
 Lance Reddick as Medical Examiner Dr Taylor
 Kevin O'Rourke as Defense Attorney Sam Tiffany
 Leslie Ayvazian as Judge Susan Valdera
 Ron Leibman as Executive Assistant District Attorney Stan Villani
 Scott Sowers as Internal Affairs Bureau Detective Waldman
 Tamara Tunie as Medical Examiner Dr. Melinda Warner
 Craig Wroe as Defense Attorney James Woodrow

Guest stars

In the second episode "Honor," Marshall Manesh played an Afghan diplomat and Anil Kumar played his son, both of whom follow Sharia law and condone honor killings. Susham Bedi played the diplomat's wife who, although powerless in her own country, in a climactic scene of the episode gets the chance to make or break a New York case. Tracy Pollan, who played Harper Anderson in Season 1, reprised her role as the paranoid rape victim-turned-vigilante in the Season 2 episode "Closure."

The fifth episode, "Baby Killer," has a tragic opening in which a seven-year-old is shot by one of her classmates, played by Nicolas Martí Salgado. Carlos Leon portrayed a gang leader who played a large role in how Elias came to possess the gun and how he became traumatized enough to fire it. The sixth episode, "Noncompliance," featured Kevin Breznahan played a schizophrenic whose mother (Kathleen Chalfant) and other family, although aware that he is mentally ill, wish him nevertheless to remain off medication because the real world seems to him even more frightening than his delusional one. The seventh episode, "Asunder," in which he played a police officer accused of spousal rape, was the first of two guest appearances SVU for Nestor Serrano. Amy Carlson guest-starred as his wife.

In the thirteenth episode, "Victims," Eric Roberts guest-starred as a vigilante ex-cop. His character killed sex offenders known to be spreading HIV every time they raped. In this episode, after a visit to a crime scene exposes him to the blood of an HIV-positive victim, Elliot Stabler begins taking antiretrovirals, which is mentioned in the next episode, "Paranoia," in which Khandi Alexander guest-starred as a police officer who secretly works for internal affairs.

In episode fifteen, "Countdown," Andrea Bowen played a key witness who helps the SVU track a serial killer. In the episode "Runaway", Kelly Karbacz played a teenage girl who goes missing. Sean Nelson guest-starred as an informant who helps the SVU search for her. About "Runaway" showrunner Neal Baer said, "That's the only episode ever broadcast just once on the network — because it was stinky." However, the producers still decided to showcase a scene from the episode in the Season 1 DVD extras to help analyze Cragen's character.

In the eighteenth episode, "Manhunt", noted for exploring the partnership between Detectives Munch and Tutuola, R.E. Rodgers and Paul Sparks guest-starred as a serial killing duo. R.E. Rodgers' character is revealed to be the smarter of the two when he murders his partner and escapes to Canada. The second last episode, "Pique", featured Margot Kidder as a woman who sexually abuses her son (Chad Lowe), a disturbed killer whose sexual fetish is piquerism. In an interview with Larry King, Lowe talked about how exciting this role was. Specifically, "if you're playing a serial killer, you can't play them with judgement [sic]. You have to try to get inside their minds. So the further removed it is from your own experience, the more of a challenge it is."

Episodes

References

Bibliography

External links
 Law & Order: Special Victims Unit Season 2 on Internet Movie Database
 Law & Order: Special Victims Unit Season 2 on TV Guide
 Law & Order: Special Victims Unit Season 2 on TV.com
 Law & Order: Special Victims Unit Season 2 on The TV IV

02
2000 American television seasons
2001 American television seasons